Grand Prix motorcycle racing is the premier championship of motorcycle road racing, which has been divided into three classes: MotoGP, Moto2, and Moto3. Classes that have been discontinued include 500cc, 350cc, 250cc, 125cc, 80cc, 50cc and Sidecar.  The Grand Prix Road-Racing World Championship was established in 1949 by the sport's governing body, the Fédération Internationale de Motocyclisme (FIM), and is the oldest motorsport World Championship.

The Teams' World Championship is awarded to the most successful team over a season, as determined by a points system based on Grand Prix results. It is awarded since 2002 in MotoGP, and since 2018 in Moto2 and Moto3. All the riders for each team contribute points towards the Championship. The winner of the teams' world championship is not necessarily the team of the riders' world champion. For example, in 2016, Marc Márquez who rode for Repsol Honda Team won the riders' world championship, but in the teams' standings, Movistar Yamaha MotoGP have higher points than Repsol Honda Team, therefore Movistar Yamaha MotoGP won teams' world championship.

By year

By team
Teams in bold are participating in any of the classes (except MotoE) of the 2022 World Championship.

By country
Countries in bold have teams of that nationality participating in any of the classes (except MotoE) of the 2022 World Championship.

References

External links
The Official MotoGP Website

Grand Prix motorcycle racing
Motorcycle racing champions
Grand Prix